The 2020 Dragon Quest: The Adventure of Dai anime is based on the manga series of the same name written by Riku Sanjo and illustrated by Koji Inada, based on the popular video game franchise Dragon Quest. It tells the story of a young hero called Dai who, along his companions, fights to protect the world from an army of monsters led by the Dark Lord Hadlar and his master, the Dark King Vearn. It was announced during Jump Festa 2020 that there would be a new anime adaptation that would premiere in fall 2020. The anime is produced by Toei Animation and is a hybrid of 2D and CG animation. Unlike the original 1991 series, it adapted the entire plot of the manga series in 100 episodes. The series aired on TV Tokyo and other affiliates from October 3, 2020 to October 22, 2022.

The opening themes for the series are "Ikiru o Suru" by Macaroni Enpitsu from episodes 1-50 and "Bravest" by Taichi Mukai from episode 51 until its finale. The ending themes are "mother" by Macaroni Enpitsu from episodes 1-25, "Akashi" by XIIX from episodes 26-50, "Namae" by Humbreaders from episode 51-74 and "Tobutori wa" by Mitei no Hanashi from episode 75 until its finale.

Muse Communication licensed the second series in Southeast Asia. Toei simulcasts the series with English subtitles in North America, Latin America, New Zealand, Africa, the Middle East and Europe via Crunchyroll, as well as Hulu in the United States and Anime Digital Network in France. There were plans to dub it from Ocean Media, however, it caused a dispute that lead the voice-actor's union SAG-AFTRA to issue a do-not-work order for the series. On September 26, 2022, the first 25 dubbed episodes separate from Ocean Media's planned version were released in the United Kingdom on BBC's iPlayer.


Episode list

Home media release

Japanese

See also

 Dragon Quest: The Adventure of Dai (1991 TV series)
 List of Dragon Quest: The Adventure of Dai characters
 List of Dragon Quest: The Adventure of Dai volumes

Notes

References

Dragon Quest: The Adventure of Dai
Dragon Quest: The Adventure of Dai (2020)